Frank M. Hursley (November 21, 1902 – February 3, 1989) and Doris Hursley (September 29, 1898 – May 5, 1984) were an American husband-and-wife team of screenwriters, best known for their serials, especially the medical drama General Hospital.

Biographical 
The couple were writers on the Western series Have Gun, Will Travel, but became famous in the soap world in 1957 when they began writing for the CBS Daytime show Search for Tomorrow. They continued to write Search for Tomorrow even after the show that they created, General Hospital, had premiered. Another married couple that were television writers, Theodore and Mathilde Ferro, wrote the show in its early months.

They created the medical drama General Hospital, for ABC Daytime in 1963. It was the first serious effort by that network to create a daytime serial. Today, General Hospital is the longest-running daytime serial on American television. The duo head wrote the show until 1973, when they handed the reins to their daughter and son-in-law, Bridget and Jerome Dobson. In 1969, the Hursleys created and wrote the NBC Daytime soap opera Bright Promise that starred Dana Andrews as college president Tom Boswell. However, they soon left that series and it was eventually cancelled in 1972. The Hursleys retired from writing serials.

Personal lives
Doris was the eldest daughter of Socialists Victor Berger and Meta Berger (he a Congressman; she an organizer and feminist)and held a law degree from Marquette University. Frank Hursley left his first wife, Madeleine, and their one-year-old son, Frank Jr., both of Detroit, and became an English professor at the University of Wisconsin's Milwaukee Extension. After Doris's divorce in 1935 from her first husband, Colin Welles, she married Frank in 1936. The couple began writing for radio during World War II and moved from their home in Thiensville, Wisconsin, to California in 1946.

Their daughter Bridget also became a television writer, creating soap opera Santa Barbara.

References

External links

American soap opera writers
Married couples
Showrunners
General Hospital

[./Https://michigantoday.umich.edu/2013/07/29/a8670/ "The Real-Life Soap Opera of GENERAL HOSPITAL creator, Frank Hursley"